"Wait till You See Her" (or, sung by a female, "Wait till You See Him") is a popular song.  The music was written by Richard Rodgers, the lyrics by Lorenz Hart. 

The song was published in 1942 and introduced in the musical play, By Jupiter (1942) where it was performed by Ronald Graham. Since then, the song has been recorded by many artists.

Selected recordings
 Vic Damone - included on his album That Towering Feeling! (1956).
 Ella Fitzgerald recorded it on her 1956 Verve release: Ella Fitzgerald Sings the Rodgers & Hart Songbook; her version was remixed by De-Phazz in 2002.
 Blossom Dearie - Blossom Dearie (1957). Her first recording for Verve Records.
 Frank Sinatra - included the song on the CD reissue of his album Close to You (1957). His version was originally recorded on April 4, 1956.
 Doris Day - Duet with André Previn (1962)
 Johnny Hartman - on This One's for Tedi (1985)
 Nancy Sinatra - the song was featured in 1967 TV special: Movin' with Nancy, starring Nancy Sinatra, released to home video in 2000.
 John Abercrombie Quartet - Wait till you see her, ECM 2102 
 Kurt Elling - Close Your Eyes Album, Blue Note 1995

Notes

Songs with music by Richard Rodgers
Songs with lyrics by Lorenz Hart
1942 songs
Nancy Sinatra songs
1940s jazz standards
Songs from Rodgers and Hart musicals